is a town located in Hōsu District (formerly Fugeshi District), Ishikawa Prefecture, Japan. , the town had an estimated population of 17,840 in 7,689 households, and a population density of 65 persons per km2.

Geography
Noto occupies the northeastern coastline of Noto Peninsula, facing the Sea of Japan on the east and south. Noto has a humid continental climate (Köppen Cfa) characterized by mild summers and cold winters with heavy snowfall.  The average annual temperature in Noto is 12.8 °C. The average annual rainfall is 2282 mm with September as the wettest month. The temperatures are highest on average in August, at around 25.2 °C, and lowest in January, at around 2.1 °C.

Much of the town is within the limits of the Noto Hantō Quasi-National Park.

Neighbouring municipalities
Ishikawa Prefecture
Suzu
Wajima
Anamizu

Demographics
Per Japanese census data, the population of Noto has declined over the past 50 years.

History
The area around Noto was part of ancient Noto Province. During the Sengoku Period (1467–1568), the area was contested between the Hatakeyama clan, Uesugi clan and Maeda clan, with the area becoming part of Kaga Domain under the Edo period Tokugawa shogunate.  Following the Meiji restoration, the area was organised into Fugeshi District, Ishikawa.

On March 1, 2005 the town of Noto and the village of Yanagida, both formerly from Fugeshi District, merged with the town of Uchiura, formerly from Suzu District, to form the new town of Noto. Also on this date, Fugeshi District merged with Suzu District to become the newly created Hōsu District. The kanji of the name was changed from 能都 to 能登 after the merger, but the pronunciation remains the same.

Economy
The economy of Noto was traditionally heavily dependent on commercial fishing and agriculture.
 Kanburi (adult yellowtail fish captured in winter)
 Strawberries of Akasaki
 Blueberry Jam/Vine of Yanagida

Education
Noto has six public elementary schools and four public middle schools operated by the town government, and one public high school operated by the Ishikawa Prefectural Board of Education.

Transportation

Railway
The town has no passenger railway service since the closure of the Noto Line on April 1, 2005.

Highway

Local attractions
 Mawaki Jōmon site, a wetland site occupied between the Early Jōmon period and the last stage of the Final Jōmon periods.
 Abare Festival
 A statue of a giant squid. The statue caused controversy after the town's administrators used ¥25m of COVID-19 emergency funding to build it.

References

External links

  
 A photo of the 2009 Abare Festival

 
Towns in Ishikawa Prefecture
Populated coastal places in Japan